X-Force  is an ongoing comic book series featuring the fictional superhero team of the same name, published by Marvel Comics in various incarnations beginning in 1991.

Publication history

X-Force Volume 1: 1991–2001

Liefeld period
X-Force was created by illustrator Rob Liefeld after he started penciling The New Mutants comic book in 1989 with #86. The popularity of Liefeld's art led to him taking over the plotting duties on the book. With help from writer Fabian Nicieza, who provided the dialogue for Liefeld's plots, Liefeld transformed the New Mutants into X-Force in New Mutants #100, the book's final issue. Liefeld and Nicieza launched X-Force in August 1991. Rob Liefeld obtained the name for the series from an unknown artist at a convention a few months prior to its release. With the aid of a multiple-variant poly-bagged card, the book sold a record 5 million copies. The original line-up of the team included Boom-Boom, Cable (son of Cyclops and Madelyne Pryor), Cannonball (believed to be an External), Domino, Feral (sister of  Thornn of X-Factor), Shatterstar and Warpath (brother of Thunderbird of the X-Men); Siryn (daughter of Banshee of the X-Men) was added to the team in the third issue.

The main opponents of X-Force during its first year were the terrorist Mutant Liberation Front, led by Stryfe, a masked mutant with a mysterious link to Cable. Early issues also featured the wise-cracking mercenary Deadpool, the immortal Externals, and a new version of the Brotherhood of Mutants.

Propelled by Liefeld's art, X-Force became one of Marvel's bestselling comic books immediately after its debut. The series rivaled The Amazing Spider-Man and Uncanny X-Men in popularity, particularly with the adolescent demographic. Toy Biz responded to X-Force's popularity by introducing an X-Force action figure line alongside its X-Men action figure line. Liefeld illustrated the series up to #9 and stopped plotting it after #11, as he had become increasingly frustrated with not owning characters he created and that his art was being used on a variety of merchandise while he allegedly received little royalties. Along with six other popular Marvel artists, Liefeld left Marvel Comics in 1992 to form Image Comics.

Nicieza period
X-Force continued with Nicieza taking over creative control of the series. Nicieza soon had the team break away from Cable and moved them to a new base in the ruins of Warpath's childhood home at the Camp Verde reservation; he also had former New Mutants Sunspot and Rictor join the team. The series crossed over with most other X-Men related books in the fall of 1992 with the X-Cutioner's Song storyline, co-plotted by Nicieza (who was also writing X-Men vol. 2). In that story, Stryfe frames Cable for an assassination attempt on the X-Men's founder Professor X, leading to a clash between the X-Men and X-Force. The crossover boosted Cable's popularity, despite the character's apparent death in X-Force #18, leading to his own solo series being launched in 1993.

After X-Cutioner's Song, X-Force continued under Nicieza with new artist Greg Capullo. With Cannonball taking over as leader, X-Force develop an identity of their own as an independent team. Cable would return in the Fatal Attractions crossover, with a less hardline leadership stance. Capullo departed from the series at this point, first succeeded by Matt Broome and then Tony Daniel. The team grew into a dysfunctional family, and the title regularly combined soap opera plot threads, such as romance and Siryn's alcoholism, with violent action. Nicieza fleshed out previously unknown elements of each character's history, including Siryn's family in Ireland, Rictor's in Mexico, Cannonball's in Kentucky, and Shatterstar's in Mojoworld. This period also saw reappearances of characters from the group's New Mutants days, such as Rusty and Skids, Danielle Moonstar, and Cypher and Wolfsbane. In issue #40 the team moved to a new underground base beneath Manhattan, formerly belonging to the supervillain Arcade. A long-simmering sub-plot about Reignfire and the disappearance of Sunspot came to a climax just as the book went on hiatus for the Age of Apocalypse crossover event in 1995, ending on a cliffhanger.

Loeb period
X-Force was radically overhauled in the wake of Age of Apocalypse from issue #44, with a new creative team of writer Jeph Loeb and illustrator Adam Pollina. The in-progress Reignfire story was apparently resolved off-panel between issues, and the team's Manhattan base was abruptly blown up in the X-Men Prime one-shot special. As part of a general editorial push to more closely integrate the various X-Men books, Loeb had the team move in with the X-Men at the X-Mansion and effectively become the X-Men's junior team, complete with introducing new uniforms modelled on the X-Men. Loeb's first issue also saw Cannonball and Rictor written out of the series, with Cannonball “graduating” to the X-Men and Rictor quitting; Caliban, a super-strong albino mutant who possessed the mind of a child, joined the team. Stories in this period generally toned down the series' levels of action and violence. The character Boomer (formerly Boom-Boom) also changed her codename to Meltdown and adopted a new aggressive attitude. Loeb's final story, the three-part Shatterstar Saga, brought Rictor back to the team; it also ambiguously retconned Shatterstar's origins in a manner that was generally regarded as unnecessarily confusing.

Moore period
In 1997, writer John Francis Moore took over the series and began revisiting plot developments that had been left ignored throughout Loeb's run, including Dani Moonstar infiltrating the MLF and the true perpetrator of the Camp Verde massacre. Following the Operation Zero Tolerance storyline, the team effectively disbanded in issue #70, and Cable, Caliban, Domino, Rictor and Shatterstar were written out of the series. The next year's worth of issues followed the remaining cast members Meltdown, Siryn, Sunspot, Warpath and Danielle Moonstar on a road trip across America. During this time James Proudstar was able to get closure on the massacre of his tribe, and subsequently stopped using the codename Warpath. The Reignfire story was also followed up on, with a new and more complete explanation for what had actually happened during Sunspot's disappearance. Former team members Cable, Cannonball, Domino, Rictor and Shatterstar all made one-off reappearances, as did New Mutants characters Karma and Skids.

In 1998, Moore and new artist Jim Cheung had X-Force move into new headquarters in San Francisco, returned Cannonball and later Domino to the team, and added Bedlam, a mutant who could disrupt electronic equipment; they also gained a new ally in sorceress Jennifer Kale. A new major antagonist came to prominence in the Damocles Foundation, an organisation founded by rogue Deviants, Eternals and humans. Former New Mutant Magma also reappeared as an antagonist. Dani Moonstar acquired new superpowers, being able to manipulate quantum energies. Towards the end of the run, Siryn and Sunspot left the team and continued as recurring guests. The 1999 annual centred around Rictor and Shatterstar, showing what they had been doing since leaving the team together.

Sales steadily declined throughout this period, falling from selling over 100,000 copies per issue to between forty and fifty thousand by the end of Moore's run with issue #100. A similar sales decline was observed in other ancillary X-Men titles, including Generation X and X-Man.

Counter-X
Writer Warren Ellis, known for his dark, cynical style, was put in charge of revamping X-Force along with Generation X and X-Man under the branding Counter-X, as part of the Revolution revamp of the various X-Men titles in 2000. Ellis' stint on X-Force over issues #102–115, co-written by Ian Edginton and illustrated by Whilce Portacio, saw Bedlam, Cannonball, Meltdown, and Warpath become a covert ops superhero team under the leadership of Pete Wisdom, a British mutant and former intelligence agent who could shoot burning blades of energy from his fingers. Despite the changes in creators, sales continued to decline at the same rate. The run concluded with Bedlam, Cannonball, Meltdown and Warpath all appearing to die in an explosion, although all were revealed to be alive soon after.

In early 2001, the X-Force title was completely reimagined by writer Peter Milligan and artist Mike Allred, who replaced the existing incarnation of the team with an entirely different group of mutants using the X-Force name. Issue #116 saw the introduction of a new, sardonically toned X-Force consisting of colorfully dressed and emotionally immature young mutants put together and marketed to be media superstars. X-Force was canceled with issue #129 in late 2002 and relaunched as X-Statix in late 2002.

X-Force Volume 2: 2004-2005
In 2004, Marvel released a new six-issue X-Force. Some controversy arose from Liefeld's insertion of over ten pages from previous unpublished comic books (Weapon X and Cable: First Contact) with word balloons edited to make them fit the X-Force storyline. It was subsequently followed with a four-issue prequel X-Force: Shatterstar miniseries.

X-Force Volume 3: 2008–2010
A new X-Force ongoing series was launched in February 2008, written by Craig Kyle and Christopher Yost and drawn by Clayton Crain.

Cyclops forms a black ops incarnation of X-Force that uses lethal force to permanently deal with threats against mutants. Warpath, Wolfsbane, Wolverine and X-23 form the starting lineup, with Angel, Domino and Elixir joining soon after. Yost had at one point stated that Deadpool would join the cast to bring more diversity to the team, but this did not happen until after his run and the launch of Uncanny X-Force. This team does battle Red Hulk and his team, consisting of Deadpool, Punisher, Elektra and Thundra, as they try to hunt down Domino.

X-Force Volume 4: 2014–2015
As part of the "All-New Marvel NOW!" campaign, a new volume of X-Force was launched in February 2014, replacing Cable and X-Force and Uncanny X-Force vol. 2. It was written by X-Men: Legacy writer Simon Spurrier and illustrated by Rock-He Kim and Jorge Molina. It features a team of Cable, Psylocke, Fantomex, Dr. Nemesis, and Marrow. The title has ended with 15 issues.

X-Force Volume 5: 2018–2019
A new volume of X-Force was launched in December 2018. This volume was written by Ed Brisson and illustrated by Dylan Burnett. It features a team of young Cable, Warpath, Boom-Boom, Shatterstar, Deathlok and Cannonball, written by Ed Brisson. It started with the legacy numbering of #231 (adding the issues of X-Force vol 1,2,3,4 and Uncanny X-Force Vol 1,2) This volume ended with issue #10 in order to allow for the Jonathan Hickman led relaunch of all X-Men-related titles.

X-Force volume 6: 2019
X-Force was relaunched in November 2019 as a part of Dawn of X, written by Benjamin Percy and illustrated by Joshua Cassara (pencils) and Dean White (colors). The initial team comprised Beast, Black Tom Cassidy, Domino, Jean Grey, Sage and Wolverine, with Kid Omega and Colossus joining in issues #2 and #7 respectively.

X-Force members
The members of the New Mutants changed the team name to X-Force in New Mutants #100 (1991).

Contributors

Writers
Rob Liefeld: X-Force #1–12 & vol. 2 #1–6 (August 1991–July 1992 & October 2004–March 2005)
Fabian Nicieza: X-Force #1–43 & Annual #1–3 & vol. 2 #1–6 (August 1991–February 1995 & October 2004–March 2005)
Jeph Loeb: X-Force #44–61 (July 1995–December 1996)
John Dokes: X-Force #62 (January 1997)
John Francis Moore: X-Force #63–76 & #78–100 (February 1997–April 1998 & June 1998–March 2000)
Joseph Harris: X-Force #77 & #101 (May 1998 & April 2000)
Warren Ellis & Ian Edginton: X-Force #102–105 (May–August 2000)
Ian Edginton: X-Force #102–115 (May 2000–June 2001)
Peter Milligan: X-Force #116–129 (July 2001–August 2002)
Craig Kyle & Christopher Yost: X-Force vol. 3 #1–#28 (February 2008–September 2010)
Si Spurrier: X-Force vol. 4 #1–15 (February 2014–February 2015)
Ed Brisson: X-Force vol. 5 #1–10 (December 2018–September 2019)
Benjamin Percy: X-Force vol. 6 #1– (November 2019–ongoing)
Gerry Duggan: X-Force vol. 6 #14 (November 2020)

Artists
Rob Liefeld: X-Force #1–7 & #9 & vol. 2 #1–6 (August 1991–June 1992 & October 2004–March 2005)
Mike Mignola: X-Force #8 (March 1992)
Mark Pacella: X-Force #10–13 (May–August 1992)
Terry Shoemaker: X-Force #14 (September 1992)
Greg Capullo: X-Force #15–25 (October 1992–August 1993)
Matt Broome: X-Force #26–27 & #29
Tony Daniel: X-Force #28, #30–36, #38–41 & #43
Paul Pelletier: X-Force #37
Adam Pollina: X-Force #44–81
Jim Cheung: X-Force #82–84, #86–88, #90, #94–95 & #98–100
Whilce Portacio: X-Force #102–106 (May–September 2000)
Mike Allred: X-Force #116–123 & #125–128 (July 2001–August 2002)
Darwyn Cooke: X-Force #124
Duncan Fegredo: X-Force #129
Clayton Crain: X-Force vol. 3 #1–6, #11–16 & #21–25 (February–August 2008, January–June 2009 & November 2009–March 2010)
Mike Choi: X-Force vol. 3 #7–10, #17–20 & #26–28 (September–December 2008, July–October 2009 & April–June 2010)
Alina Urusov: X-Force vol. 3 #11 (January 2009)
Rock-He Kim: X-Force vol. 4 #1–3, #7–9, #11–12, #14–15 (February 2014–February 2015)
Jorge Molina: X-Force vol. 4 #4–6 (April–June 2014)
Tan Eng Huat: X-Force vol. 4 #10 (October 2014), #13 (December 2014)
Dylan Burnett: X-Force vol. 5 #1–4, #8–10 (December 2018–March 2019, May–July 2019)
Damian Couceiro: X-Force vol. 5 #5-7 (March–May 2019)
Joshua Cassara: X-Force vol. 6 #1–5, #9–10, #14– (November 2019–January 2020, March–July 2020, November 2020–ongoing)
Stephen Segovia: X-Force vol. 6 #6 (January 2020)
Jan Bazaldua: X-Force vol. 6 #7–8, #11–12 (February 2020, August–September 2020)
Viktor Bogdanovic: X-Force vol. 6 #13 (October 2020)

Cover art
Rob Liefeld: X-Force #1–9 & #11 and #50 & #100 variants (August 1991 – January 1996)
Greg Capullo: X-Force #15–27 (October 1992 – October 1993)
Whilce Portacio: X-Force #102–109 (May 2000 – December 2000)
Mike Allred: X-Force #116–128 (July 2001 – August 2002)
Clayton Crain: X-Force, vol. 3 #1–6, #11–13, #14–16 (variants) & #21–25
Bryan Hitch: X-Force, vol. 3 #1 (variant)
Mike Choi: X-Force, vol. 3 #7–10 & #17–20 (November 2008 – February 2009 & September–December 2009)
Kaare Andrews: X-Force, vol. 3 #14–16
Adi Granov: X-Force, vol. 3 #26–28
David Finch: X-Force, vol. 3 #26–28 (variants)
Pepe Larraz & David Curiel: X-Force, vol. 5 #1–present (December 2018 – present)
Dustin Weaver: X-Force, vol. 6 #1–14 (November 2019–November 2020)

Cast

Volume 1

Volume 2

Volume 3

Volume 4

Volume 5

Volume 6

Prints

Volume 6

Collected editions

Volume 1 Epic Collections

Other Trade Paperbacks

Volume 1 Premiere Hardcovers

Volume 1 Oversized Hardcovers

Volume 2

Volume 3

Volume 4

Volume 5

Volume 6

References